Avinash Chebbi is an Indian playback and orchestra singer from Karnataka. He has sung many hit songs in Kannada. Most popular song are from the movies of Murali Meets Meera and Sidlingu. Most of his songs are of 'melody' genre.

Awards
 SIIMA award for "Nee Naadhe Naa" from Murali Meets Meera
 BIG Male Singer Award - BIG 92.7 FM for "Nee Naadhe Naa" from Murali Meets Meera
 Film Fare award for "Ellelo Oduva Manase" from Sidlingu. The music for this movie is composed by Anoop Seelin

He is the only Kannada singer who has received back to back awards for his first two songs.

References 

Kannada playback singers
Living people
Year of birth missing (living people)
Place of birth missing (living people)
Indian male playback singers